GHT may refer to:
 Garden hose thread
 Generalised Hough transform
 Ghadames Air Transport, Libya, ICAO code
 Ghat Airport, Libya, IATA code
 Gilman Housing Trust
 Gloucester Harbour Trustees
 Gorlov helical turbine
 Göteborgs Handels- och Sjöfartstidning, a defunct Swedish newspaper
 Great Himalaya Trails
 Gresham Technologies plc, UK software company, LSE code
 Kutang language, ISO 639-3 code
 George H. Thomas, a noted American Civil War general